As with many countries, pollution in the United States is a concern for environmental organizations, government agencies and individuals.

Pollution from U.S. manufacturing has declined massively since 1990 (despite an increase in production). A 2018 study in the American Economic Review found that environmental regulation is the primary driver of the reduction in pollution.

Land
Examples of land pollution include:
Love Canal
Greenpoint oil spill
Murphy Oil Spill (Chalmette, Louisiana)
Prudhoe Bay oil spill

Superfund

Air

Air pollution is caused predominantly from burning fossil fuels, cars and much more. Natural sources of air pollution include forest fires, volcanic eruptions, wind erosion, pollen dispersal, evaporation of organic compounds, and natural radioactivity. These natural sources of pollution often soon disperse and thin settling near their locale. However, major natural events such as volcanic activity can convey throughout the air spreading, thinning and settling over continents. Fossil fuel burning for heating, electrical generation, and in motor vehicles are responsible for about 90% of all air pollution in the United States.

Water

Freshwater
In a report published in the November 12, 2008 online issue of Environmental Science and Technology, researchers found that freshwater pollution by phosphorus and nitrogen costs U.S. government agencies, drinking water facilities and individual Americans at least $4.3 billion annually. Of that, they calculated that $44 million a year is spent just protecting aquatic species from nutrient pollution.

Oceans

Oils

1969 Santa Barbara oil spill
2007 San Francisco Bay oil spill
2008 New Orleans oil spill
1989 Exxon Valdez oil spill
2010 Deepwater Horizon oil spill

Pesticides

The use of DDT and its consequences as a pollutant is attributed as sparking the environmental movement in the United States.

Radioactivity
Three Mile Island accident

Waste

Plastic Waste 
See also resources-conservation-and-recycling

In 2015 study, the scientists also published a chart listing the top 20 nations contributing plastic waste, which has since been widely circulated. The top five plastic polluters included China, Indonesia, the Philippines, Vietnam, and Thailand. The United States ranked twentieth, the only wealthy nation on the list. “We were not attempting to re-do the 2015 study,” says Kara Lavender Law, a marine scientist at the Sea Education Association in Woods Hole, Massachusetts, and the new study’s lead author. “The whole point was to examine the United States.” Analysing, 2016 data, the team found that as much as 3 percent of all plastic waste generated in the U.S. was either littered or illegally dumped in the environment.  In all, the United States contributed up to 2.24 million metric tons into the environment in 2016, and of that, more than half—1.5 million metric tons—was along coastlines, meaning it had a high probability of slipping into the oceans.

Polystyrene
Worldwide there are numerous environmental organizations attempting to ban the use of polystyrene. One such organization in the U.S. is Californians Against Waste.  The city of Berkeley, California, was one of the first cities in the world to ban polystyrene food packaging (called Styrofoam in the media announcements). It was also banned in Portland, Oregon and Suffolk County, New York in 1990. Now, over 20 US cities have banned polystyrene food packaging, including Oakland, California, on Jan 1, 2007. San Francisco introduced a ban on the packaging on June 1, 2007: Board of Supervisors President Aaron Peskin noted: "This is a long time coming. Polystyrene foam products rely on nonrenewable sources for production, are nearly indestructible and leave a legacy of pollution on our urban and natural environments. If McDonald's could see the light and phase out polystyrene foam more than a decade ago, it's about time San Francisco got with the program."

The overall benefits of the ban in Portland, Oregon have been questioned, as have the general environmental concepts of the use of paper versus polystyrene. The California and New York state legislatures are currently considering bills which would effectively ban expanded polystyrene in all takeout food packaging statewide.

Lobbying

Policy

The United States Environmental Protection Agency (EPA) is an agency of the federal government of the United States charged with protecting human health and with safeguarding the natural environment: air, water, and land. The EPA was proposed by President Richard Nixon and began operation on 2 December 1970, when it was passed by Congress, and signed into law by President Nixon, and has since been chiefly responsible for the environmental policy of the United States.

Environmental Discrimination
Environmental Justice is defined as "the fair treatment and meaningful involvement of all people regardless of race, color, sex, national origin, or income with respect to the development, implementation and enforcement of environmental laws, regulations, and policies" by the United States Environmental Protection Agency. It is a social movement that aims to ensure all citizens have equal rights and opportunities to reside in a safe environment. The movement began in the 1980s as evidence was mounting that companies were targeting minority and low-income communities. Due to the lack of community action among minorities and low-come, corporations found little resistance when applying to build environmentally polluting factories.

Executive Order 12898
On February 11, 1994, President William Clinton signed Executive Order 12898 "Federal Actions To Address Environmental Justice in Minority Populations and Low-Income Populations". Its purpose was to create the "Interagency Working Group on Environmental Justice". It provided directions to the "Working Group" on how to develop and manage an effective system for preventing environmental injustices. The "Working Group" was made up of various heads of federal agencies and tasked with creating guidelines for reporting, tracking, and developing regulations to curb environmental discrimination.

Plan EJ 2014
In 2014, EPA has a strategy known as Plan EJ 2014. It is not, however, a rule or regulation.

The goals of the plan are to:
•	Protect health in communities over-burdened by pollution
•	Empower communities to take action to improve their health and environment
•	Establish partnerships with local, state, tribal and federal organizations to achieve healthy and sustainable communities.

The Toxic 100
Common offenders of environmental discrimination are corporations that build environmentally hazardous sites. These are typically waste processing facilities, energy companies such as coal plants, chemical plants, and manufacturers who use specific chemicals known to be hazardous to both the environment and/or human health. Other industries known for being responsible for negatively impacting the United States include transportation and energy mining and drilling. A list called The Toxic 100 is maintained by the Political Economy Research Institute (PERI), an institute at the university off Massachusetts Amherst, of the United States' top polluters. PERI uses a formula: Emissions (millions of pounds) x Toxicity x Population Exposure. Population is measured by its proximity to nearby residents, as well as, prevailing winds and height of smokestacks. The data on chemical releases come from the U.S. Environmental Protection Agency's Toxics Release Inventory (TRI).

See also
Cancer Alley
Environment of the United States
Environmental racism
Environmental racism in Europe
Uranium mining and the Navajo people
List of Superfund sites
Toxic 100 - the top 100 polluters in the US
Regional Clean Air Incentives Market (RECLAIM, an emission trading scheme in California)
Anderson v. Cryovac - a landmark federal case concerning toxic contamination in Woburn, Massachusetts
Hexavalent chromium pollution in the United States

References

External links
United States Environmental Protection Agency - Pollution page
Scorecard Home (data about pollution in the United States)